Freeburg Community High School is a high school located in Freeburg, Illinois, United States. The Freeburg Community High School District #77 controls it.

Freeburg Community High School was founded in 1904 as a two-year school and graduated its first class of four students in 1906. In 1923, after converting to a traditional four-year high school, two students were presented with Freeburg High School diplomas. The existing school was constructed in 1929, becoming "Home of the Freeburg Midgets." The original mascot was named Marty the Midget, a name that lasted through the nineteen sixties.

Notable alumni
C. T. Wilson - member, Maryland House of Delegates

References

External links 

Home page

Educational institutions established in 1904
1904 establishments in Illinois
Public high schools in Illinois
Schools in St. Clair County, Illinois